Family Pharmacy is a network of 2,100 independently owned and operated pharmacies. The servicemark Family Pharmacy is owned by AmerisourceBergen. AmerisourceBergen also supplies Good Neighbor Pharmacy, a similar but distinct network. It can be considered a retailers' cooperative.

External links
 Family Pharmacy 

Pharmacies of the United States
Retailers' cooperatives in the United States